Sagittunio subrostratus, commonly referred to as the pondmussel or black pondmussel, is a species of freshwater mussel, an aquatic bivalve in the family Unionidae, the river mussels.

This species is endemic to the United States.

References

External links
 Lea I. (1834). Observations on the naïades; and descriptions of new species of that, and other families. Transactions of the American Philosophical Society. (NS) 5: 23–119, pls 1–19
 Conrad, T. A. (1849). Descriptions of new fresh water and marine shells. Journal of the Academy of Natural Sciences of Philadelphia. (2) 1(4): 275–280, plates 37–39
  Lea, I. (1859). Descriptions of seven new species of uniones from South Carolina, Florida, Alabama and Texas. Proceedings of the Academy of Natural Sciences of Philadelphia. 11: 154–155
 Lea, I. (1868). Description of sixteen new species of the genus Unio of the United States. Proceedings of the Academy of Natural Sciences of Philadelphia. 20: 143-145
 Simpson, C. T. (1914). A descriptive catalogue of the naiades, or pearly fresh-water mussels. Part I Unionidae, Truncilla - Margaritana. Bryant Walker, Detroit, Michigan. Pp. 1–524

subrostratus
Molluscs of the United States
Endemic fauna of the United States
Freshwater bivalves
Taxa named by Thomas Say
Bivalves described in 1831